(born 31 October 1984 in Mie, Japan) is a Japanese rugby union player. Imamura has played 38 international matches for the Japan national rugby union team.

Imamura was a member of the Japan team at the 2007 Rugby World Cup and the 2011 Rugby World Cup.

References

Living people
1984 births
Japanese rugby union players
Asian Games medalists in rugby union
Rugby union players at the 2010 Asian Games
Kobelco Kobe Steelers players
Japan international rugby union players
Asian Games gold medalists for Japan
Medalists at the 2010 Asian Games
Japan international rugby sevens players
Rugby union centres
Rugby union wings
Munakata Sanix Blues players